Saint-Patrice-de-Beaurivage is a municipality in the Municipalité régionale de comté de Lotbinière in Quebec, Canada. It is part of the Chaudière-Appalaches region and the population is 1,054 as of 2009. It is named after Saint Patrick, as the first settlers were Irish. Beaurivage is associated to the seigneurie of Beaurivage, also known as Saint-Gilles.

References

External links
Commission de toponymie du Québec

Municipalities in Quebec
Incorporated places in Chaudière-Appalaches
Designated places in Quebec
Lotbinière Regional County Municipality
Canada geography articles needing translation from French Wikipedia